Spasi Sofia is a Bulgarian non-governmental watchdog organization. The organization monitors the work of the mayor and the administration of Sofia Municipality and raises the public awareness of many problems in the city management.

The organization has been a vocal critic of numerous issues with the management of the public transport network, road infrastructure, public procurement and investments, the preservation of historic buildings and the city's cultural heritage.

At the 2019 Bulgarian local elections Boris Bonev of Spasi Sofia was a candidate for both Mayor of Sofia and municipal councilor. He finished 4th in the mayoral election with 10,77% of the popular vote and was elected as municipal councilor.

In 2022, Spasi Sofia announced their intention to become a political party, and held an official 'founding congress' on the 15th of February 2023.

References

External links 
 Official website (English)
 Facebook page

Non-governmental organizations
2015 establishments in Bulgaria